Christian Dominique Borle (born October 1, 1973) is an American actor and singer. He is a two-time Tony Award winner for his roles as Black Stache in Peter and the Starcatcher and as William Shakespeare in Something Rotten!. Borle also originated the roles of Prince Herbert, et. al. in Spamalot, and Emmett in Legally Blonde on Broadway. He starred as Tom Levitt on the NBC musical-drama television series Smash, and starred as Marvin in the 2016 Broadway revival of Falsettos.

Early life
Borle was born and raised in Pittsburgh, Pennsylvania, the son of Andre Bernard Borle (1930–2011), a professor of physiology at the University of Pittsburgh. His love for Star Wars and drawing made him dream of becoming a comic book artist when he grew up, but it was only when a friend convinced him to audition for a school play in his second year at Shady Side Academy that he began to develop an interest in acting.

Borle attended the School of Drama at Carnegie Mellon University, graduating in 1995. After he graduated, he moved to New York City and landed his first acting job. He worked as an elf at Macy's Santaland.

Career

1995–2004: Early career and Broadway debut 
Soon after moving to New York City, Borle was cast in the German production The Who's Tommy. Returning to the states, he joined the national tour of West Side Story in 1996, as a replacement for the role of Riff. Borle was next cast as Willard Hewitt in the first national tour of Footloose, which opened on December 15, 1998, at the Allen Theatre in Cleveland, Ohio.

After his tenure as Willard, Borle made his Broadway debut in the ensemble of the 2000 revival of Jesus Christ Superstar. He left the production after two months to reprise his role of Willard Hewitt (succeeding Tom Plotkin) in the Broadway production of Footloose in June 2000. Soon after joining the company, the show received its closing notice, and Borle remained with the show for a few weeks through its final performance on July 2, 2000.

He was the dance captain and understudy for several characters for the short-lived 2002 musical Amour.

Borle appeared in a 2003 advertisement for California-based online auction company eBay. In the 30-second TV spot, Borle plays a store clerk who breaks into song and dance when asked about a product. The song, "That's on eBay", was a parody of the Dean Martin standard "That's Amore". Also in 2003, he replaced Gavin Creel in the role of Jimmy in Thoroughly Modern Millie. He married his co-star, actress Sutton Foster, who had played Millie, in September 2006. Borle and Foster divorced in 2009.

2005–2010: Spamalot and Legally Blonde 
Borle performed in Monty Python's Spamalot, in which he originated a number of roles, including Prince Herbert, the Historian, Not Dead Fred, A French Guard, and Sir Robin's Minstrel. His performance earned him a 2005 Drama Desk Award nomination as Outstanding Featured Actor in a Musical and a Broadway.com Audience Award for Favorite Featured Actor in a Musical. He is known for originating the role of Emmett Forrest in Legally Blonde on Broadway, for which he was nominated for the Tony Award for Best Featured Actor in a Musical. The musical is based on MGM's 2001 film of the same name.

He was featured in the Encores! staged concert version of On the Town as Ozzie in November 2008. He appeared in a workshop production of a new play titled Peter and the Starcatcher in 2009. He played Bert in the Broadway production of Mary Poppins, replacing Adam Fiorentino in the role on October 12, 2009, and then left the cast July 15, 2010.

In 2010, he played a golf caddy in the film The Bounty Hunter. In Fall 2010/Winter 2011, Borle played the role of Prior Walter in Signature Theatre Company's 20th anniversary production of Tony Kushner's Angels in America.

2011–2014: Smash and Peter and the Starcatcher 
On February 25, 2011, it was announced that Borle had joined Steven Spielberg's new NBC pilot Smash with Debra Messing, Anjelica Huston, Katharine McPhee, Brian d'Arcy James, and Megan Hilty. The series follows a cross section of characters who come together to mount a Marilyn Monroe-themed musical (which is called Bombshell) on Broadway. In May 2011, it was reported that NBC had picked up the show as a series for the 2011–2012 season. In March 2012, NBC announced it would renew the series for a second season with 15 episodes. The show was officially cancelled by NBC in May 2013.

Borle was a member of the original cast in the Regional and Off-Broadway productions of Peter and the Starcatcher that ran until April 24, 2011. He reprised the role of "Black Stache" on Broadway in April 2012, where his performance earned him his second Tony Award nomination and first win as Best Featured Actor in a Play. He ended his run in the Broadway production of Peter and the Starcatcher on June 30, 2012, to take a break before taping for Smash began in August 2012.

Borle played Max Dettweiler in the live television production of The Sound of Music Live!, which aired on NBC on December 5, 2013. He played Mr. Darling and Mr. Smee in the live TV production of Peter Pan Live!, which aired on NBC on December 4, 2014.

2015–2018: Something Rotten! and Falsettos 
He won the 2015 Tony Award for Best Performance by an Actor in a Featured Role in a Musical for Something Rotten!, playing the role of William Shakespeare, which opened on Broadway at the St. James Theatre on March 23, 2015, in previews and officially on April 22, 2015. Borle provided the voice of Mr. Bungee on the cast recording of Encores! A New Brain. Dan Fogler, who played the part onstage, was unable to record the album as he was busy filming Fantastic Beasts and Where to Find Them.

Borle played Marvin in the limited Broadway revival of Falsettos, directed by James Lapine, alongside Andrew Rannells and Stephanie J. Block who played Whizzer and Trina, respectively. Borle left the cast of Something Rotten! on July 16, 2016, to prepare for Falsettos, which opened in previews on September 29, 2016, and officially on October 27, 2016. Borle was nominated for a Tony Award for his performance. The show closed on January 8, 2017, after 30 previews and 84 performances.

Borle also made an appearance with his former wife, Sutton Foster, in Gilmore Girls: A Year in the Life. His musical talents were used in Episode 3 for the Star's Hollow musical, which walked through the history of the quirky small town. The two had "found Gilmore Girls together and became fans of the show long before there were talks of a revival. For both actors, being a part of the Stars Hollow world was a special experience because they already loved the show before they became involved with it."

On May 9, 2016, it was announced that Borle would play Willy Wonka in the Broadway production of Roald Dahl's Charlie and the Chocolate Factory at the Lunt-Fontanne Theatre, which opened on March 23, 2017. A cast album was announced March 21, 2017. The show played its final performance January 14, 2018.

Borle made his directorial debut with Popcorn Falls, which premiered at the Riverbank Theatre in Marine City, Michigan. The show ran from August 18–27, 2017. It was such an unexpected success that the theatre had to add extra performances to keep up with demand.

In March 2018 it was announced that Borle would again reunite with Sutton Foster, this time for two episodes of her TV show Younger as a journalist named Don Ridley. He was also announced as the lead in the Encores! production of Me and My Girl, alongside former Mary Poppins co-star Laura Michelle Kelly.

2019–present: Little Shop of Horrors and Some Like It Hot 
In July 2019, it was announced that Borle would star as Orin Scrivello in the Off-Broadway revival of Little Shop of Horrors, which began previews at the Westside Theatre on September 17, 2019, with an official opening of October 17. Borle won a Lucille Lortel Award and has been nominated for an Outer Critics Circle Award for his performance.

In August 2021 it was announced that Borle would star in the 2022 Encores! season. Borle was cast as the Baker in Into the Woods, running from May 4–15, 2022. This would have been his third show in the 2022 Encores! season. Borle was ultimately replaced by Neil Patrick Harris.

In March 2022 it was announced that Borle was cast in a workshop for the new musical Some Like It Hot (musical), an adaptation of the 1950s film, as Joe/Josephine. He originated this role on Broadway and is currently performing the show at the Shubert Theatre (Broadway).

Personal life
Borle met actress Sutton Foster in college and they married on September 18, 2006. They divorced in 2009. In 2012, Foster said that she and Borle remain friends and continue to support and appear in each other's work.

Theatre credits

Filmography

Film

Television

Discography

Cast albums 
 Prodigal (Original York Theatre Cast)
 Elegies (Original Off-Broadway Cast)
 Spamalot (Original Broadway Cast)
 Legally Blonde: The Musical (Original Broadway Cast)
 Bombshell (Smash TV Cast)
 The Sound of Music Live! (2013 TV Cast)
 Peter Pan Live! (2014 TV Cast)
 Something Rotten! (Original Broadway Cast)
 James and the Giant Peach (World Premiere Cast)
 A New Brain (2015 New York Cast)
 Falsettos (Original Broadway Revival Cast)
 Charlie and the Chocolate Factory (Original Broadway Cast)
 Little Shop of Horrors (The New Off-Broadway Cast)

Singles 
 "Don't Say Yes Until I've Finished Talking" (featured in Smash Season 1)
 "A Love Letter From the Times" (duet with Liza Minnelli, featured in Smash Season 2)
 "Vienna" (featured in Smash Season 2)
 "The Right Regrets" (duet with Debra Messing, featured in Smash Season 2)

Awards and nominations

References

External links
 
 
 
 

1973 births
Living people
American male stage actors
Male actors from Pittsburgh
American male musical theatre actors
Carnegie Mellon University College of Fine Arts alumni
20th-century American male actors
21st-century American male actors
20th-century American singers
20th-century American male singers
21st-century American male singers
21st-century American singers
American male dancers
American male television actors
American male film actors
American male voice actors
Tony Award winners
American people of Swiss descent
Drama Desk Award winners
Shady Side Academy alumni